Andover is an unincorporated community in Wise County, Virginia, United States. Andover had a post office until it closed on November 3, 2008; it still has its own ZIP code, 24215.

References

Unincorporated communities in Wise County, Virginia
Unincorporated communities in Virginia
Coal towns in Virginia